Epithelial cell transforming sequence 2 oncogene-like is a protein that in humans is encoded by the ECT2L gene.

Clinical relevance
Recurrent mutations of this gene have been associated to cases of acute lymphoblastic leukaemia.

References

Further reading